Brovin is a Russian masculine surname, its feminine counterpart is Brovina. It may refer to
Flora Brovina (born 1949), Kosovar Albanian poet, pediatrician and women's rights activist
Vasili Brovin (born 1982), Russian football player

Russian-language surnames